Sultan Al Nahyan, an Arabic name, may refer to:
Sultan bin Shakhbut Al Nahyan, ruler of Abu Dhabi, father of Khalifa, himself a ruler of Abu Dhabi
Sultan bin Zayed bin Khalifa Al Nahyan (r. 1922–1926), ruler of Abu Dhabi, Sultan bin Shakhbut grandson
Sultan bin Zayed bin Sultan Al Nahyan (born 1956), First Deputy Prime Minister of UAE, Sultan bin Zayed bin Khalifa grandson, son of UAE first president Zayed bin Sultan Al Nahyan
Sultan bin Khalifa Al Nahyan (born 1965), Emirati businessman and the son of Emirati ruler Khalifa bin Zayed Al Nahyan